Chinook High School is a high school (grades 9-12) in the town of Chinook, Blaine County, Montana. Matt Molyneaux is the principal. Its notable alumni include Mike Tilleman.

See also
 List of high schools in Montana

References

External links
 CHINOOK PUBLIC SCHOOLS website

Schools in Blaine County, Montana
Public high schools in Montana